Kafralu Island was a man-made island built in 1911 on a sandbar alongside Cedar Point in Northeast Ohio.

History 
Louis E. Wagner and his sons built Kafralu Island over a course of twenty years by hauling in logs and fill. Wagner coined the name Kafralu by combining the name of his wife (Katherine) with the names of his sons (Frank and Louis).

Wagner built cottages on the island, which were rented out during the summer months to tourists and other guests that would use the island for hunting, fishing, and vacations.

Kafralu Island, up until 1939 was never registered with the local real estate tax office. When it was discovered that it had no legal owner by Cedar Point Company they filed an original deed to the property, and the land was taken from Louis as he was physically removed from the property and the cottages destroyed to make way for the new Cedar Park expressway. As this was the family sole source of income, the family became destitute as no compensation was ever given to the family. Louis died shortly after losing his island. Today the island can still be seen while traveling the Cedar Point Causeway as the large grassy wooded area on the west side. 

On September 11, 2016, Kafralu Island was the site of the worst auto accident to happen on Cedar Point property when a male driver went off the right side of the road before over correcting and going left of center, striking two oncoming vehicles. The driver was ejected from his vehicle and found along a densely wooded part of the island. The driver was pronounced dead at nearby Firelands Medical Center and two young women were also treated and released.

References

Landforms of Erie County, Ohio
Islands of Lake Erie in Ohio